Minh N. Do (born 1974) is a Professor in the Department of Electrical and Computer Engineering of the University of Illinois at Urbana–Champaign in Urbana, Illinois. He also holds positions at the Coordinated Science Laboratory, the Beckman Institute for Advanced Science and Technology, the Advanced Digital Sciences Center, and the Department of Bioengineering.

Education and career
Do was born in Thanh Hóa, Vietnam. In the 1990s, he immigrated to Australia and attended the University of Canberra there, graduating with a Bachelor of Engineering degree in Computer Engineering in 1997. He then flew to Switzerland, where in 2001, he got his Doctor of Science degree in Communication Systems from the École Polytechnique Fédérale de Lausanne.

Recognitions
In 1991, Do was a silver medallist of the International Mathematical Olympiad and in 1997 he was awarded a University Medal from the University of Canberra. He was named Fellow of the Institute of Electrical and Electronics Engineers (IEEE) in 2014 for contributions to image representation and computational imaging.

References

External links

1974 births
Living people
Vietnamese engineers
University of Canberra alumni
École Polytechnique Fédérale de Lausanne alumni
University of Illinois Urbana-Champaign faculty
Fellow Members of the IEEE
International Mathematical Olympiad participants
People from Thanh Hóa province
21st-century American engineers
Place of birth missing (living people)